Jalan Bukit Changgang, or Jalan Perak Kanan, Federal Route 248 (formerly Selangor Federal Route B20), is a federal road in Selangor, Malaysia. The Kilometre Zero is at Kampung Bukit Changgang.

History 
In 2012, the road was gazetted as the federal roads by JKR as Federal Route 248.

Features 

At most sections, the Federal Route 248 was built under the JKR R5 road standard, allowing maximum speed limit of up to 90 km/h.

List of junctions

References

Malaysian Federal Roads